Ajuga zakhoensis is a herbaceous flowering plant native to northern Iraq. It was first described in 1982.

References

zakhoensis
Garden plants of Asia
Groundcovers
Flora of Iraq